Edmonton Storm may refer to:

Edmonton Storm (football), a Canadian women's tackle football team
Edmonton Storm (rugby league), an Australian club in the Cairns District Rugby League
Hemel Storm, an English basketball team formerly known as Edmonton Storm